Plasticity Product is a term coined by Jerry Rudy to refer to mRNA genetic artifacts and protein products triggered by transcription factors leading to long-lasting long term potentiation.

Introduction
The term "plasticity product" was coined by Jerry Rudy to refer to mRNA genetic artifacts and protein products triggered by transcription factors, leading long-lasting long term potentiation (L-LTP) and sustained alterations in synaptic strength.

Rudy differentiates between two types of long term potentiation: S-LTP (short-lasting) and L-LTP (long-lasting). In S-LTP the stimulus is strong enough to induce long-term potentiation but too weak to trigger intracellular events necessary to sustain synaptic changes. L-LTP is much less transient than S-LTP and involves the generation of new proteins through translation and transcription.

Induction of L-LTP depends on the transcription of new mRNA and the translation of these new mRNA into proteins. These steps are encompassed by the genomic signaling hypothesis as follows:
A stimulus is strong enough to induce L-LTP is delivered.
A signaling cascade begins, leading to phosphorylation of transcription factors.
mRNA is produced leading to subsequent translation of new proteins to sustain synaptic changes.

Support for the genomic signaling hypothesis comes from studies conducted by Nguyen et al. demonstrating the inability to induce L-LTP following transcription inhibition immediately following the inducing stimulus but not if transcription is blocked later. The temporal effects of this inhibition suggests that L-LTP is dependent on newly synthesized "plasticity products."

cAMP-responsive element-binding (CREB) protein, a transcription factor, is also implicated in changes in synaptic plasticity. Inhibition of CREB translation likewise inhibited synaptic changes. CREB is activated in its phosphorylated form, acting as a molecular switch for production of plasticity products.

Two Waves of Protein Synthesis

There are two waves of protein synthesis following LTP induction. The first involves local transcription and translation of mRNA and the second involves the genomic signaling cascade.

Transcription and Local Translation of mRNAs
There is fast-acting, local translation of proteins in the dendritic region near the spines when an inducing high-frequency stimulus is applied, indicating that some plasticity-relevant mRNAs are already present and ready to be translated. To facilitate translation outside of the soma, since synapses depend on some proteins to be synthesized on site, translation machinery such as ribosomal assemblies and endoplasmic reticulum are present in dendrites (specifically in the spine neck and shaft). Local protein synthesis at the dendrites is a mechanism permitting rapid synaptic changes in response to neural activity. However, since the mRNAs existed in the dendrites prior to plasticity-inducing stimulation, they do not count as plasticity products.

Genomic Signaling Cascade
A synapse-to-nucleus or soma-to-nucleus signaling cascade induced by synaptic activity leads to the transcription of new plasticity products in the soma of the cell. Mechanistically, signaling molecules phosphorylate cAMP-responsive element binding protein (CREB), which is a transcription factor and molecular memory switch that initiates production of mRNAs in the cell nucleus. These plasticity products must then travel back to activated synapses, meaning that this wave of plasticity product synthesis is slower.

Examples of Plasticity Products
A plasticity product must fit these criteria:

a) Plasticity products are proteins that are important for the maintenance of long-lasting LTP.

b) Plasticity products result from any cell-signaling cascade that is triggered by strong HFS.

PKM ζ
PKM ζ are protein consequences of LTP stimuli and are crucial components of the short-term LTP mechanism. Recent research concludes that the protein kinase PKMζ is a "core molecule" in maintaining late-LTP. Tetanic stimulation leads to an increase in PKMζ expression, and since PKMζ was established as necessary for maintaining late-LTP. When L-LTP is induced, synthesis of PKMζ from its brain-specific mRNA increases, and this constitutively active kinase maintains LTP in tagged synapses by upregulating AMPA receptor trafficking pathways.

Some experimental results implicating PKM ζ as a plasticity product are as follows:

 Ling et al. found that PKM ζ is necessary and sufficient for LTP maintenance. When they added an inhibitory form of PKM ζ, LTP was blocked. LTP was also blocked when they added PKM ζ inhibitors.

 Yao et al. also show that pKM ζ is functionally critical for the maintenance of long-lasting LTP,  specifically through its mediation of NSF/GluR2-dependent AMPA receptor trafficking. This conclusion was drawn from experiments involving blocking NSF/ GluR2 interactions by adding a myristoylated version of pep2m (a peptide that mimics the NSF - binding site in GluR2). This blockage prevented the expression of LTP persistence at 1 hour after high frequency stimulation (tetanization). Hernandez et al. found that LTP increases de novo synthesis of PKM ζ. They induced LTP in the CA1 region of hippocampal slices by 2 100 Hz 1s trains, 20 s apart. Then they homogenized the slices, and immunoprecipitated PKM ζ with antiserum. Label depicted the new synthesis, of which there was a large increase.

CaMKII
CaMKII (Calcium-calmodulin-dependent protein kinase II) is a protein kinase that must be activated by calmodulin in order to phosphorylate other proteins in the cell. It is important in modifying the postsynaptic response to glutamate (by modifying the conformation of AMPA receptors to allow a larger influx of sodium ions), and contributes to strengthening synapses. The production of the CAMKII enzyme is upregulated with plasticity-inducing stimuli.

Some experimental results implicating CaMKII as a plasticity product are as follows:

 Giece et al. discovered that the calcium-calmodulin-dependent kinase II is required for hippocampal long-term potentiation. When they inhibited CaMKII, LTP was prevented. Also, in genetically altered mice with a CaMKII form that cannot stay active, LTP was greatly reduced.

 However, CaMKII is not synthesized, it is modified, making it a questionable candidate under the above criteria. Researchers Blitzer et al. show that high frequency stimulation induced cAMP dependent increase in CaMKII phosphorylation and calcium-independent CaMKII activity. CA1 homogenates were probed with an antibody specific for Thr286 – phosphorylated CaMKII and an antibody detecting total CaMKII. They observed a 22% increase in CaMKII activity after LTP-inducing HFS.

References

Genetics terms